Lambula phyllodes is a moth of the family Erebidae. It was described by Edward Meyrick in 1886. It is found in Australia.

References

Lithosiina
Moths described in 1886